Raghunathpur is a village in Purwa block of Unnao district, Uttar Pradesh, India. As of 2011, its population is 756 people, in 142 households, and it has one primary school and no medical clinics.

References

Villages in Unnao district